Son of Euro Child is an album by Euros Childs, released in September 2009. It is his fifth solo album. It is available as a free download from Childs' official website.

Track listing
"Shithausen"
"Gently All Around"
"Like This? Then Try This"
"How Do You Do"
"Rat-Clock"
"Look At My Boots"
"1,000 Pictures Of You"
"Carrboro"
"My Baby Joy"
"The Dog"
"Harp i a ii ar #1"
"The Fairy Feller's Masterstroke"
"Harp i a ii ar #2"
"Mother Kitchen"
"Son of Shithausen"

References 

2009 albums
Euros Childs albums